William A. Longacre  II (December 16, 1937 - November 2015) was an American archaeologist and one of the founders of the processual "New Archaeology" of the 1960s.

Early life

Bill Longacre grew up in Houghton, Michigan.  His father was William A. Longacre, a physics professor at Michigan Technological University; his mother was Doris Longacre.

Education
Longacre got his bachelor's degree in anthropology from the University of Illinois in Urbana, Illinois, having transferred from the College of Mining and Technology (which is now Michigan Technological University).  In 1963, he completed his doctorate in the same subject, with a focus on Southwestern archaeology.

Academic career
The year following his PhD, he was hired as an assistant professor of anthropology at the University of Arizona (UA). In 1989, he became head of the department and in 1998 the Fred A. Riecker Distinguished Professor.  In 2004, he was designated emeritus Riecker Professor at UA.

Longacre directed the UA Archaeological Field School at Grasshopper Pueblo from 1964 until 1979.

Longacre also did research in the Philippines and taught at the University of the Philippines as a visiting professor.

"He published numerous seminal works, including his most famous, 'Anthropology as Archaeology: A Case Study.' This groundbreaking work reconstructed aspects of prehistoric social organization at the Carter Ranch Site, a small 13th-century puebloan community in eastern Arizona."

Awards
 SAA Award for Excellence in Ceramic Research 
 UA  Raymond H. Thompson Award  (posthumous)

Selected Publications
Longacre, William A. 1964. “Archaeology as Anthropology: A Case Study,” Science 144:1454–1455.

Longacre, William A. 1966. “Changing Patterns of Social Integration: A Prehistoric Example from the American Southwest,” American Anthropologist 68(1):94–102

Longacre, William A. 1970a. “Archaeology as Anthropology: A Case Study,” Anthropological Papers 17. Tucson: University of Arizona Press.

Longacre, William A., ed. 1970b. Reconstructing Prehistoric Pueblo Societies. Albuquerque: University of New Mexico Press.

Longacre, William A. 1973. “Current Directions in Southwestern Archaeology,” Annual Review of Anthropology 2:201–219.

Longacre, William A. 2010. “Archaeology as Anthropology Revisited,” Journal of Archaeological Method and Theory 17(2): 81–100.

Longacre, William A., ed. 1991. Ceramic Ethnoarchaeology. Tucson: University of Arizona Press.

Longacre, William A., Sally J. Holbrook, and Michael W. Graves, eds. 1982. “Multidisciplinary Research at Grasshopper Pueblo, Arizona,” Anthropological Papers 40. Tucson: University of Arizona Press.

Longacre, William A., and James M. Skibo, eds. 1994. Kalinga Ethnoarchaeology: Expanding Archaeological Method and Theory. Washington, DC: Smithsonian Institution Press.

Skibo, James M., Miriam T. Stark, and Michael W. Graves, eds. 2007.  Archaeological Anthropology: Perspectives on Method and Theory. Tucson: University of Arizona Press.  (publication based on a symposium on Longacre's impact on archaeology)

References

American archaeologists
1937 births
2015 deaths